The Green Alliance (Alyans zelonykh), in 2012-2014 Alliance of Greens — People’s Party (AGPP; ; Alyans zelonykh — Narodnaya partiya, AZNP), in 2014-2015 Alliance of Greens and Social Democrats (AGSD; ; Alyans zelonykh i sotsial-demokratov, AZSD) was a Russian political party based on Oleg Mitvol's Green Alternative movement (founded in 2009) and founded in 2012 as a party. The party is headed by Alexander Zakondyrin.

The party was originally founded by a Russian billionaire Gleb Fetisov and Oleg Mitvol. Gleb Fetisov left the party chairmanship and exited the party in December 2015.

On 25 January 2014, the Gleb Fetisov-led Alliance of Greens — People’s Party united at their 3rd congress with four almost unknown parties of Gennady Gudkov’s Social Democrats of Russia, Freedom and Justice, Kolokol (“bell”) and the Party of Free Citizens. Gennady Gudkov and Gleb Fetisov became co-chairmen of the Alliance of Greens and Social Democrats. Oleg Mitvol became the chairman of the alliance’s central council. Gleb Fetisov, Dmitry Gudkov, Ilya Ponomarev, Elena Lukyanova, Dmitry Nekrasov and others became the members of the party's council.

On 12 December 2015, after a party coup at the December Congress, a member of the Public Chamber of Moscow Alexander Zakondyrin was elected the party chairman. The name of the party was changed from the Alliance of Greens and Social Democrats to Green Alliance. The positions of co-chairmen were abolished.

On October 2, 2019, the Supreme Court of Russia, following a lawsuit by the Ministry of Justice, liquidated the party for insufficient participation in the elections for 7 years.

Ideology 

According to their website, they believe in:
 Sustainable development and new quality of life for Russian citizens
 Environmental protection
 Non-violence
 Grass-root democracy
 Social justice

References

External links
Alliance of Greens – The People's Party 
 Alliance of Greens – The People's Party 
Green Alternative movement (founded in 2009 by Oleg Mitvol)
Alliance of Greens and Social Democrats 
news reports about new party
news reports about new party
Russia’s Greens and Social Democrats united in common alliance

2012 establishments in Russia
Green political parties in Russia
Political parties established in 2012
2019 disestablishments in Russia
Political parties disestablished in 2019
Formerly registered political parties in Russia
Defunct political parties in Russia